The 1920 United States Senate election in California was held on November 6, 1920. Incumbent Democratic Senator James Duval Phelan ran for re-election but was defeated by Republican attorney Samuel Morgan Shortridge.

Republican primary

Candidates
William Kent, U.S. Representative from Marin County
Samuel Morgan Shortridge, attorney and candidate for Senate in 1914
Albert Joseph Wallace, Lieutenant Governor

Results

General election

Candidates
Elvina S. Beals (Socialist), nominee for Lt. Governor in 1918 
James S. Edwards (Prohibition), nominee for Secretary of State in 1920 and Congress in 1910, 1914, and 1916
James Duval Phelan (Democratic), incumbent Senator
Samuel Morgan Shortridge (Republican), attorney and candidate for Senate in 1914

Results

See also 
  1920 United States Senate elections

References 

1920 California elections
California
1920